9 Agincourt Street, Monmouth, Wales is a late 17th century townhouse which became the estate office of the agent of the Dukes of Beaufort in the mid 19th century. It is a Grade II* listed building. In commercial use since its construction, it now houses a firm of architects.

History
Cadw suggests a construction date close to 1700. The building was refaced in the 19th century and has since been unaltered externally. During the mid-19th century, the building was owned by the Dukes of Beaufort and used as the estate office for their substantial Monmouthshire land holdings. It was converted by a firm of architects in the late 20th century and now houses their offices. The architects were responsible for the conversion of the nearby Beaufort Arms Hotel.

Architecture and description
The building is rendered, under a roof of Welsh slate. Of two storeys, with an attic, it has a double-front plan. The architectural historian John Newman noted the "botched" pediment while the Monmouth historian Keith Kissack recorded its Grecian fanlight. The interior has a notable dog-leg staircase dating from the late 17th century and a complete early 19th century strong-room, installed when the building was used as a solicitors' office. The building is listed Grade II*.

Notes

References 
 
 

Grade II* listed buildings in Monmouthshire
Buildings and structures in Monmouth, Wales